Drew Rosas (born Andrew Rosas) is an American independent filmmaker operating out of Wisconsin.

Filmography
Plastic Fangs (2005, short)
Independent Lens (2006, 1 episode Almost Home, as sound recordist)
Lift (2006, short, as sound mixer)
Table Talk (2007, short)
Snare (2007, short, as sound editor)
Handmade Nation (2009, as boom operator)
Modus Operandi (2009, as foley artist)
Blood Junkie (2010)
Pesticide (2010, short, as sound editor)
Billy Club (2013)
Hamlet A.D.D. (2014, as assistant director)
Shangri-LA: Pilot (2016, Pilot Episode, as director, writer, editor, and executive producer)
The Settlement (2018, series, as director, writer, and editor)
Shangri-LA: Season 1 (2019, series, as director, writer, editor, and executive producer)

As actor
Table Talk (2007)
Modus Operandi (2009, as Horror Film Director)
Billy Club (2013, as Officer Brackman)
Pester (2014, as S.O.L.A. Member - TV Commercial)
Hamlet A.D.D. (2014, as Daniel / Nathaniel)

References

External links
 

Living people
American film directors
American male film actors
Year of birth missing (living people)